Gen-Y Cops is a 2000 Hong Kong science fiction action film directed by Benny Chan and starring Edison Chen, Stephen Fung and Sam Lee. The film is a sequel to the 1999 film Gen-X Cops.

Plot

The film opens in Washington D.C., where a new government robot called RS-1 is scheduled to make its debut at a convention in Hong Kong. Doctor Cameron gives the investors a demonstration of RS-1 while agents Ross Tucker, Ian Curtis, and Jane Quigley watch. However, soon a malfunction with the robot occurs during one of its tests, resulting in the robot beginning to shoot at everyone. However, Ross and Ian shoot at the control panel which stops the robot. Cameron is now reconsidering bringing RS-1 to Hong Kong, but the investors tell Cameron to fix the issue and send it to cover for them. The malfunction comes from a hack by Kurt, the designer of RS-1, who was unceremoniously fired. Kurt has plans to steal the robot and intends to get the help of rogue FBI agent Quincy.

Meanwhile, in Hong Kong, two of the original Gen-X Cops, Match and Alien, must go undercover as weapons dealers to bust a missing undercover cop named Edison. When they successfully make a deal, the duo beat up the dealer and find a room with beaten-up victims. Alien mistakes one victim for Edison, but discovers the real Edison still in cahoots with the leader of the gang, leading Edison to cover his tracks. When Alien and Match learn that the gang running the operation has stolen the Hong Kong police entry for the robot convention, their cover is blown and Match, Alien, and Edison are forced to fight not only cage fighters, but defeat the gang and have them all arrested.

The next day at headquarters, the trio of cops join others in seeing Dr. Tang demonstrating the recovered Hong Kong robot, but things do not go as planned. On the day of the convention, it is soon apparent that the Hong Kong Police and the FBI are not going to be able to get along. When Jane attempts to show a demonstration of the security system, it does not work. Edison receives a call from an old friend, and meets them that night at Jumbo Restaurant.

The old friend is Kurt, who is still somewhat shocked that Edison is a cop. When Edison tells Kurt he will help him, the two hug it out only for Kurt to drug Edison with a hypnosis drug. Under the hypnosis, Edison breaks into headquarters and steals the robot. Kurt once again hacks into RS-1 and has the robot kill Doctor Cameron. Edison breaks out of the spell and is shocked to learn that he had killed Quincy, who was actually trying to kill him and admitting Kurt's treachery beforehand. When Ian sees the dead Quincy, he fights Edison, who escapes and resorts to taking Jane as a hostage. After a standoff involving Match and Alien as well as the FBI, the two end up in Kurt's van where Edison finally learns what had happened. He and Jane make their escape, destroying the friendship between Edison and Kurt. Match and Alien soon become scapegoats when they learn that if Edison and the robot cannot be recovered, they will have to take the fall.

The next day, Edison remembers a man in a lobster suit during his hypnosis. He and Jane, who is starting to believe that Edison may be innocent after all, find the lobster man. However, they were both tracked by Match and Alien as well as the FBI. Jane returns with the FBI while Edison, Match, and Alien are being shot at by the FBI. Edison finds an unexpected ally in the lobster man, who helps him flee. As for Match and Alien, the two end up in the hospital with the injured FBI agents. A confrontation between Match and Ian almost gets physical until Ross and Chung arrive to break it up. Ian assures Match and Alien that they will take the fall if Edison and the robot are not found. Jane attempts to convince Ian that Edison may be innocent, but Ian will not hear of it. Ross tells everyone to cool off and they leave the hospital.

Edison finds Kurt in an abandoned warehouse. Match and Alien have been tracking Edison and find the robot, and wind up in the mix when they face Kurt's men. Kurt escapes again, but Match and Alien trap Edison and tell him they have to take them in to save themselves. When Match and Alien bring Edison back to headquarters, they are hailed as heroes for the arrest of Edison.

However, they soon become convinced that Edison may be innocent as well. With help from Oli, Match's techie girlfriend, and Peggy, a techie who has a serious crush on Alien, they are able to tap into Edison's memory and have learned where the robot may be found. When they decide to find RS-1, Jane confronts them only to agree to help them out. They learn Kurt plans to sell RS-1 to an Arab terrorist, but as they bust the dealers and Kurt, Ross arrives. When Jane asks Ross where backup is, Ross is revealed to be involved in the entire scheme with the dead agent Quincy. When the deal is finalized, Ian arrives in time and had learned of Ross betraying everyone only to put a tracking device himself on Ross. This leads to a confrontation while Kurt escapes with the robot. The terrorist is killed and a fight ensues between Ross and Ian. As Ross begins to get the upper hand, Match comes to the rescue and he and Ian team up, leading to Ross' death. Match and Ian realize they have to get the robot.

Kurt has unleashed the robot on the city, destroying anything in its path. Edison and Alien catch up to Kurt and RS-1 at the convention center, which results in that robot being destroyed. However, Dr. Tang installs a virus to be transferred from his robot to RS-1. When the virus is uploaded, RS-1 destroys Tang's robot. Kurt is convinced that RS-1 is the ultimate robot and when he stands in victory, the now virus-filled RS-1 guns down Kurt to his death. An attempt to take out RS-1 by Match, Alien, and Edison fails. However, with the virus came a self-destruct button, and with the clock ticking, Ian arrives by car and the trio of Hong Kong police wrap a chain around RS-1. The four cops drive to the harbor and send RS-1 into the water, where it explodes.

Match, Alien, and Edison are in the back of an ambulance when they see Ian, who tells them they have to settle one more thing: find the best bar in Hong Kong to celebrate solving the case. As Ian tells them to hurry, Edison, Match, and Alien head off to meet with Jane and Ian.

Cast
Edison Chen as Edison
Stephen Fung as Match Yeung 
Sam Lee as Alien Lee
Richard Sun as Kurt
Paul Rudd as  Ian Curtis 
Maggie Q as Jane Quigley
Christy Chung as Inspector Chung
Mark Hicks as  Ross Tucker 
Vincent Kok as Lee Wah
Cheung Tat-ming as Lymon
Anthony Wong as Dr. Tang
Eric Kot as Dr. Lai Shung-fung
Ricardo Mamood as Quincy
Reuben Langdon as Mike
Ron Smoorenburg as Cage Fighter

Production
The film was produced by Regent Entertainment and Media Asia Films. Nicholas Tse was originally set to return as Jack, the leader of the Gen-X Cops, but was unable due to a schedule conflict. Newcomer Edison Chen, a Canadian-born Chinese actor and rapper, was hired as Tse's replacement in brand new character Edison. Stephen Fung and Sam Lee signed on to return to the roles of Match and Alien. Paul Rudd made his Hong Kong film debut as FBI agent Ian Curtis.

As one reviewer described the origin of the American version of the sequel to Gen-X Cops,

Release
The film was theatrically released on 14 December 2000 in Hong Kong, while in the United States, the film was released as a Syfy Original Film premiering on the Syfy channel under the title Jackie Chan Presents: Metal Mayhem on 23 February 2002. During its theatrical run in Hong Kong from 14 December 2000 to 18 January 2001, the film grossed a total of HK$11,912,461.

References

External links

Jackie Chan Presents: Metal Mayhem official site (Sci Fi Channel). Archived from the original on February 19, 2009.
 

2000 films
2000 science fiction action films
2000 martial arts films
Hong Kong science fiction action films
Hong Kong martial arts films
Martial arts science fiction films
Police detective films
Robot films
Hong Kong sequel films
2000s Cantonese-language films
Films about terrorism
Films directed by Benny Chan
Media Asia films
Syfy original films
Films set in Hong Kong
Films shot in Hong Kong
2000s American films
2000s Hong Kong films